Pilodeudorix ankoleensis is a butterfly in the family Lycaenidae. It is found in western Uganda.

References

Endemic fauna of Uganda
Butterflies described in 1953
Deudorigini